The Center for Geospatial Research at the University of Georgia focuses on remote sensing and climate science. The center is a regional NASA DEVELOP node and was recognized by NASA in 1998 for its outstanding achievements relating to applied climate and environmental sciences, being named a NASA Center of Excellence.

Founding and History 
The University of Georgia's Center for Geospatial Research, CGR, was founded in 1985 as the Laboratory for Remote Sensing and Mapping Science. In 1989 the lab was renamed the Center for Remote Sensing and Mapping Science. This Center was founded by Dr. Roy Welch, who served as director from its founding in 1985 until 2003. The Center is now directed by Dr. Marguerite Madden and in 2012 the center was renamed Center for Geospatial Research to better reflect its internal goals. In 2016 the center helped found the UGA Small Satellite Research Laboratory.

Significant Research

Publications and Presentations

In 2016 research from the Center was used to identify the coastal regions of the United States that were most at risk from sea-level rise due to climate change. This study was one of the first studies to have accounted for ongoing population growth when assessing the potential magnitude of future impacts. Minimally 4.2 million people at risk of inundation were projected to be at risk from sea-level rise in the continental United States.

Researchers at the Center for Geospatial Research have helped students at the UGA Small Satellite Research Laboratory receive grants to build 2 satellites. These satellites will be the first satellites built, designed, and operated by the University of Georgia.

NASA DEVELOP
The Center for Geospatial Research is a regional node for the NASA DEVELOP national program and contributes significantly to climate change research. The center was published in the International Union for Conservation of Natures World Conservation Congress Publication. The study focused on ecological forecasting, reforestation and conservation efforts, and the Colombian primate Cotton-top tamarin.

The Center's DEVELOP program helps identify key issues regarding Atlanta and its suburbs. Using data from the Landsat 8 and Terra satellites the center is able to model water flow in the region and help the area build better infrastructure as it grows. Water monitoring and forecasting is

Small Satellites
The Center is also aiding the undergraduates of the Small Satellite Research Laboratory with technical knowledge. Faculty members, such as Dr. David Cotten, have given presentations on the possibilities of structure from motion in low Earth orbit and how the Small Satellite Research Laboratory could build the first satellite to perform this technology in orbit.

References

University of Georgia
Organizations established in 1985
Geographic data and information organizations in the United States
Athens, Georgia
1985 establishments in Georgia (U.S. state)